is a national highway of Japan connecting Yahata Nishi-ku, Kitakyūshū and Chikushino, Fukuoka, with a total length of 91.2 km (56.67 mi).

History
National Route 200 was originally designated a second-class national highway on 18 May 1953, connecting the then-extant district of Chikushi (the former district is now part of the city, Chikushino) with Yahatanishi-ku, Kitakyūshū.

See also

References

External links

National highways in Japan
Roads in Fukuoka Prefecture